Sir Thomas Taylor, 2nd Baronet (20 November 1686 – 18 September 1757) was an Anglo-Irish politician.

Taylor was the eldest son of Sir Thomas Taylor, 1st Baronet and Anne Cotton. He represented Kells in the Irish House of Commons between 1713 and his death in 1757. On 8 August 1736 he succeeded to his father's baronetcy and in 1753 he was made a member of the Privy Council of Ireland.

Taylor was succeeded by his son, also called Thomas Taylour, who was raised to the Peerage of Ireland as Baron Headfort in 1760 and was advanced to the title Earl of Bective  in 1766.

References

1686 births
1757 deaths
18th-century Anglo-Irish people
Irish MPs 1713–1714
Irish MPs 1715–1727
Irish MPs 1727–1760
Baronets in the Baronetage of Ireland
Members of the Parliament of Ireland (pre-1801) for County Meath constituencies
Members of the Privy Council of Ireland
Taylour family